Brandon Goodship (born 22 September 1994) is an English footballer who plays as a forward for Salisbury.

Career

AFC Bournemouth
Born in Poole, and raised in nearby Corfe Mullen, Goodship joined the AFC Bournemouth academy at the age of 12.

On 20 February 2016, Goodship joined League Two side Yeovil Town on a one-month loan deal, he made his debut later that day as a substitute against Portsmouth. He scored his first goal for Yeovil in the crucial 1–0 win over Dagenham & Redbridge, on 27 February 2016.

On 31 August 2016, Goodship joined National League side Braintree Town on a long-term loan deal.

Yeovil Town
On 13 January 2017, Goodship re-signed for Yeovil Town on a contract until the end of the 2016–17 season, after having had his Bournemouth contract cancelled by mutual consent. At the end of the 2016–17 season, Goodship was released by Yeovil along with five other players.

Weymouth
Following his release from Yeovil, Goodship signed for Southern League Premier Division side Weymouth on a one-year contract. He scored 38 league goals in his first season and won the 2017–18 Southern League Premier Golden Boot. Goodship won his first England C cap in March 2019 when he came on as a sub against Wales. He scored 39 goals in his second season with Weymouth and won the 2018–19 Southern League Premier Golden Boot again, as well as the National Game Awards Step 3/4 Player of the Season.

Southend United
On 10 June 2019, Goodship signed for League One side Southend United on a two-year-deal with the option of a further 12 months.

Weymouth
On 5 June 2021, Brandon Goodship returned to National League side Weymouth on a two-year-deal following the expiry of his contract at Southend United.

Salisbury
On 27 June 2022, Goodship joined Southern Football League Premier Division South club Salisbury.

Career statistics

References

External links

1994 births
Living people
English footballers
Association football forwards
AFC Bournemouth players
Blackfield & Langley F.C. players
Dorchester Town F.C. players
Hayes & Yeading United F.C. players
Yeovil Town F.C. players
Braintree Town F.C. players
Weymouth F.C. players
Southend United F.C. players
Salisbury F.C. players
English Football League players
National League (English football) players
Southern Football League players